The eleventh and final season of the American science fiction television series The X-Files premiered on January 3, 2018, on Fox. The season consists of ten episodes and concluded on March 21, 2018. It follows newly re-instated Federal Bureau of Investigation (FBI) agents Fox Mulder (David Duchovny) and Dana Scully (Gillian Anderson). The season's storyline picks up directly after last season's finale and the search for Mulder and Scully's son William is the main story arc of the season.

Plot overview
Dana Scully (Gillian Anderson) wakes up in the hospital after having a seizure, now realizing the events of "My Struggle II" were a vision and haven't actually happened yet. Mulder initially presumes Scully’s ramblings are a product of her illness but leaves the hospital to investigate. Agent Jeffrey Spender later appears at Scully’s bedside, revealing that someone is looking for William. He first balks at telling her the location of her son, revealing only the name of the family that adopted him—Van De Kamp. Mulder tails a henchman who he believes will take him to The Smoking Man, but he arrives somewhere else with mysterious conspirators; Mr. Y (A.C. Peterson) and Erika Price (Barbara Hershey). They try to negotiate with Mulder into turning over his son but Mulder refuses. Walter Skinner (Mitch Pileggi) tries to meet with Scully, but can't find her. As he goes to his car, he is met inside by The Smoking Man and Reyes. Meanwhile, Scully tries to leave the hospital but her seizures return causing her to crash her car. She is rescued by Agent Einstein and Agent Miller, and is readmitted to the hospital. Both agents leave the room. An assassin sent by Mr. Y and Erika enters and tries to suffocate Scully, but Mulder steps in and saves her by slicing the assassin's neck. As Skinner comes in, Mulder confronts him since he smells like smoke. In a flashback to when Skinner was in the car with the Smoking Man, the latter reveals (in a further flashback to 17 years, "En Ami") that he, not Mulder, artificially impregnated Scully.

Scully opens her eyes in the dark, laying on her side on a bed in a mysterious house. She explores the mysterious house and ends up in an endless pattern of the same room. Mulder theorizes that the experience is a type of sleep paralysis. She goes back to her memories of her sleep paralysis, where she grabs a snow globe with a model of the boat in it. Mulder and Scully get to the dock, meeting with Detective Costa (Louis Ferreira). Later, Scully’s attention is drawn to a man that observes them intently from one of the portable walkways. Costa informs them that the victims asked if they found Ghouli. When Scully turns to check if the mystery guy is there, he’s gone. Both agents investigate the two teenagers about the slashing. Both of them go on about the experience and their boyfriend, Jackson Van De Kamp. The agents arrive at the Van De Kamp household, the same house Scully saw in her dream. Two gunshots are heard with a third coming from upstairs. Scully goes up and finds the bleeding corpse of Jackson Van De Kamp. As they leave the room and the door clicks closed, the zipper opens slowly. Jackson sits up and escapes the room. Mulder meets with Skinner at the Chimera, telling him to drop the investigation. Mulder confirms that Jackson's DNA matches Scully's. At the hospital, Jackson explains to Brianna that he’s been hiding because there are people after him. He reveals that Ghouli doesn't exist and it's just something he "made up". Jackson escapes the hospital after the death of the DOD members. The next day, Scully spots a rural gas station that has a windmill just outside. Scully meets with Peter Wong with Wong mentioning that he wishes he could know her better. The agents ask to see the recording tapes. In the recording, Scully is having a conversation with William. She smiles as Mulder holds her while they see their son, alive. Over the course of the season, they search for William. In the third episode of the "Plus One", Scully and Mulder are intimate again. In the season 11 finale, "My Struggle IV", she reveals to Mulder that she is pregnant with his child. Also in the finale, the Smoking Man shoots William, who has made himself look like Mulder.

Cast

Main cast
David Duchovny as Fox Mulder, an FBI special agent assigned to the newly reopened X-Files division. He remains a believer in the paranormal and the existence of extraterrestrial life, though, throughout the series, his faith begins to waver. 
Gillian Anderson as Dana Scully, a medical doctor and FBI special agent assigned to the X-Files. Although an initial skeptic, after Mulder's abduction, she became more open-minded about the possibility of extraterrestrial life. 
Mitch Pileggi as Walter Skinner, an assistant director at the FBI and an ally of Mulder and Scully's.

Recurring cast
William B. Davis as Cigarette Smoking Man, a former government official, and nemesis of Mulder and Scully, who worked to cover up the truth of the existence of aliens and their plan to colonize the Earth. Jeremy Schuetze portrays a younger version of this character in flashbacks.
Barbara Hershey as Erika Price
Miles Robbins as Jackson Van De Kamp/William Scully, the son of Dana Scully who was given up for adoption.

Guest cast
Annabeth Gish as Monica Reyes, a former FBI agent previously assigned to the X-Files division.
James Pickens Jr. as Alvin Kersh, the Deputy Director of the FBI
Lauren Ambrose as Agent Liz Einstein, a medical doctor, Miller's partner, and a hard-skeptic.
Robbie Amell as Agent Kyd Miller, an open-minded FBI agent who believes in the paranormal, and is Einstein's partner.
Chris Owens as Jeffrey Spender
Dean Haglund as Langly, one of The Lone Gunmen.
Haley Joel Osment as Davey James
Joel McHale as Tad O'Malley

Episodes

Episodes marked with a double dagger are episodes in the series' alien mythology arc.

Production
In May 2015, in an interview with Entertainment Weekly, co-star David Duchovny stated that if the 2016 revival were successful, he would be interested in another renewal, stating, "I would be open to doing another cycle. I don't know that I could do a 20-episode version of this show at this point in my life, and I don't know that Gillian could. But I think everybody is open ended on what happens after this. Certainly, we didn't bring it back with the idea of ending it." At the 2016 Television Critics Association panel for the series, creator Chris Carter stated, "If we do well in the ratings, I can't imagine we wouldn't be asked to do more." Fox Television Group chairman and CEO Gary Newman stated that he and fellow executive Dana Walden would be open to another renewal, stating, "We would love to do this again, so we'd be on board if schedules can be worked out." In an interview with Variety prior to the premiere, co-star Gillian Anderson, Duchovny, and Walden stated their willingness for another renewal. In an interview with TV Guide, Carter reaffirmed plans for more episodes, but stressed that everyone involved is waiting on the success of the season. In May 2016, Walden confirmed that there had been conversations about an eleventh season possibly for the 2017–18 television season.

On April 20, 2017, Fox officially announced that The X-Files would be returning for an eleventh season of ten episodes, which would air in the 2017–18 television season after filming in mid-2017.

Writing
The writing staff for the eleventh season consists of Chris Carter, Glen Morgan, Darin Morgan, James Wong, and newcomers who were all previously part of The X-Files production staff, Gabe Rotter (writers assistant), Benjamin Van Allen (writers assistant) and Brad Follmer (Carter's personal assistant). In August 2017, it was announced that three female writers were added to the staff; Karen Nielsen (who worked as a script coordinator on season 10) wrote one episode, and Kristen Cloke and Shannon Hamblin wrote another episode based on a story by Glen Morgan. The season, consisting of 10 episodes, has two mythology episodes (the premiere and finale) and eight standalone episodes; however, several critics have considered episode five, "Ghouli", to also be a mythology episode.

Casting
In addition to Duchovny and Anderson, Mitch Pileggi was confirmed to reprise his role, as Walter Skinner. Also returning are William B. Davis as Cigarette Smoking Man and Annabeth Gish as Monica Reyes. In August 2017, it was confirmed that Robbie Amell and Lauren Ambrose would reprise their roles Agents Miller and Einstein from season ten. In September 2017, it was announced that Karin Konoval–who played Mrs. Peacock in the fourth-season episode "Home"–would play new characters in the eleventh season, in what Carter described as a "tour-de-force performance". Anderson commented that this is her final season of The X-Files, saying, "I've said from the beginning this is it for me." However, Chris Carter affirmed he would not do The X-Files without her character, saying, "For me, The X-Files is Mulder and Scully. I think if it were without Scully, I wouldn't do it. That's not my X-Files." The writers intended to bring back Robert Patrick as his character John Doggett, but he was unavailable due to scheduling issues as he was filming for his TV series Scorpion.  In February 2018, Carter stated in an interview that he could see the show continuing without Anderson.

Filming
Filming began in August 2017 in Vancouver, British Columbia, where the previous season was filmed, along with the show's original five seasons. After controversy sparked regarding the lack of female writers or directors on the series, it was announced in August 2017 that Carol Banker, a script supervisor on the original series who also directed an episode of The Lone Gunmen and Holly Dale were added as directors.

Reception

Critical reviews
The eleventh season received generally positive reviews from critics and currently has a Metacritic score of 67 out of 100 based on 18 reviews. On Rotten Tomatoes, the season has an approval rating of 77% with an average rating of 6.65 out of 10 based on 170 reviews. The site's consensus reads, "Though it may not make many new believers, The X-Files return to business as usual is a refreshing upgrade from the show's underwhelming previous outing." Similar to season 10, the premiere and finale episodes of season 11 received poor reviews, while the stand-alone episodes occurring between them were much more favorably received.

Based on the first five episodes available for review, Liz Shannon Miller of IndieWire gave the season a positive review with a "B+" grade. While Miller wrote that the season premiere "is not good", she was much more positive of the following four standalone episodes, writing that "there are some intriguing mysteries, some eerie moments, solid action" and praised Darin Morgan's comedy installment, calling it "fantastic". Overall, she concluded, "Season 11 so far isn't flawless, but it's a lively, character-focused affair that feels far more unified than we'd ever anticipated, a massive improvement over Season 10 that gives us genuine hope for the second half. For the first time in a while, we're truly excited to see more." Matt Zoller Seitz of Vulture stated that compared to the previous season, "This new batch of episodes is considerably stronger. Even the ones that don't really do much but spin their wheels do so with feeling, and when the show is great—as it is, yet again, in Darin Morgan's episode—it's downright sublime."

Ratings

Notes

References

External links

 
2018 American television seasons
Television shows featuring audio description